Northeast Ring Line of Beijing Suburban Railway (BCR) is a commuter rail line in Beijing. The local government plans to upgrade the line in the long term to provide urban railway services similar to the Yamanote Line. 

The line runs on the existing Beijing Northeast Ring railway (Shuangqiao–Shahe railway). The line will be  in length with 4 stations.

Stations

References

Railway lines in China
Rail transport in Beijing
Standard gauge railways in China
Transport infrastructure under construction in China